Kladno District is a district in the Central Bohemian Region of the Czech Republic. Its capital is the city of Kladno.

Administrative division
Kladno District is divided into two administrative districts of municipalities with extended competence: Kladno and Slaný.

List of municipalities
Cities and towns are marked in bold and market towns in italics:

Běleč -
Běloky -
Beřovice -
Bílichov -
Blevice -
Brandýsek -
Braškov -
Bratronice -
Buštěhrad -
Černuc -
Chržín -
Cvrčovice -
Doksy -
Dolany -
Drnek -
Družec -
Dřetovice -
Dřínov -
Hobšovice -
Horní Bezděkov -
Hořešovice -
Hořešovičky -
Hospozín -
Hostouň -
Hradečno -
Hrdlív -
Hřebeč -
Jarpice -
Jedomělice -
Jemníky -
Kačice -
Kamenné Žehrovice -
Kamenný Most -
Kladno -
Klobuky -
Kmetiněves -
Knovíz -
Koleč -
Královice -
Kutrovice -
Kvílice -
Kyšice -
Lány -
Ledce -
Lhota -
Libochovičky -
Libovice -
Libušín -
Lidice -
Líský -
Loucká -
Makotřasy -
Malé Kyšice -
Malé Přítočno -
Malíkovice -
Neprobylice -
Neuměřice -
Otvovice -
Páleč -
Pavlov -
Pchery -
Pletený Újezd -
Plchov -
Podlešín -
Poštovice -
Pozdeň -
Přelíc -
Řisuty -
Sazená -
Slaný -
Šlapanice -
Slatina -
Smečno -
Stehelčeves -
Stochov -
Stradonice -
Studeněves -
Svárov -
Svinařov -
Třebichovice -
Třebíz -
Třebusice -
Tuchlovice -
Tuřany -
Uhy -
Unhošť -
Velká Dobrá -
Velké Přítočno -
Velvary -
Vinařice -
Vraný -
Vrbičany -
Zájezd -
Zákolany -
Želenice -
Zichovec -
Žilina -
Žižice -
Zlonice -
Zvoleněves

Geography

The district is characterized by a rugged landscape without large differences in altitude, mostly flat in the north and east and hilly in the south and west. The territory extends into three geomorphological mesoregions: Lower Eger Table (north), Prague Plateau (central and eastern part), Křivoklát Highlands (south) and Džbán (small part in the west).

There are no major rivers. The most important watercourses are the Loděnice (a tributary of the Berounka, which crosses the southern part of the district, and the Bakovský Stream, which flows across the northern part and then joins the Vltava just beyond the district border. There are relatively many small ponds in the area. A notable body of water is also Klíčava Reservoir, which lies only partially in the district.

Křivoklátsko is the only protected landscape area that extends into the district, in its southwestern part.

Demographics

Most populated municipalities

Economy
The largest employers with its headquarters in Kladno District and at least 1,000 employers are:

Transport
The D7 motorway from Prague to Chomutov, including the unfinished section, leads across the district. The D6 motorway from Prague to Karlovy Vary passes through the southern part of the district.

Sights

The most important monuments in the district, protected as national cultural monuments, are:
Lidice Memorial in Lidice
Medieval gord of Budeč
Tomb of Tomáš Garrigue Masaryk in Lány

The best-preserved settlements, protected as monument reservations and monument zones, are:
Třebíz (monument reservation)
Slaný
Smečno
Unhošť
Velvary

The most visited tourist destination is the Lidice Memorial.

References

External links

Kladno District profile on the Czech Statistical Office's website

 
Districts of the Czech Republic